The 2016 season is FC Kansas City's fourth season.
The team competes in the National Women's Soccer League, the top division of women's soccer in the United States.

First-team squad

Match results

Preseason 
FC Kansas City announced their preseason schedule on February 24, 2016.

National Women's Soccer League

Regular season 
On February 18, NWSL announced the 2016 season schedule.

Postseason playoff
FC Kansas City ended in 6th position on regular season and did not qualify for the 2016 NWSL playoffs.

Regular-season standings 

Results summary

Results by round

Squad statistics
Source: NWSL

References

External links

 

FC Kansas City
FC Kansas City seasons
FC Kansas City
FC Kansas City